Barend Labuschagne (born 13 December 1968) is a South African wrestler. He competed in the men's freestyle 74 kg at the 1992 Summer Olympics.

References

1968 births
Living people
South African male sport wrestlers
Olympic wrestlers of South Africa
Wrestlers at the 1992 Summer Olympics
Place of birth missing (living people)